The Estadio Ignacio López Rayón is a multi-use stadium in Zitácuaro, Michoacán, Mexico.  It is currently used mostly for football matches and is the home stadium for Deportivo Zitácuaro.  The stadium has a capacity of 10,000 people.

References

External links

Sports venues in Michoacán
Estadio Ignacio López Rayón
Athletics (track and field) venues in Mexico